The Miami Coalition of Christians and Jews is a nonsectarian nonprofit organization dedicated to advancing understanding and respect among people of all cultures, religions and races. The organization strives for a community free from intolerance in which every person enjoys dignity and respect.

History 
The agency was founded in 1935 as a regional chapter of the National Conference of Christians and Jews (NCCJ), which later became the National Conference for Community and Justice. As part of the decentralization of NCCJ, the agency became an independent 501c3 in 2005 and — returning to its roots — changed its name to Miami Coalition of Christians and Jews.

Following the 1980 McDuffie riots, MCCJ worked with the Community Relations Board to formulate policy recommendations through a process of community hearings which resulted in the Overcoming Racial and Ethnic Isolation in Miami report.

Activities 
Since its creation in 1935, the agency has served as a vital force for improving intergroup relations by creating safe havens for dialogue, training inclusive leaders, highlighting the benefits of diversity, and building bridges of understanding and respect among the different communities that call Greater Miami home.

MCCJ also worked with the Miami Dade and City of Miami Police Departments, facilitating diversity training and community conversations with law enforcement professionals.

After the Elian Gonzales controversy, MCCJ and the Miami Herald co-facilitated 9 community dialogues with different leadership sectors.

Often characterized as a human relations organization, MCCJ is also a human rights organization, advocating respect for all, working to eliminate discrimination and helping minorities gain rights, access and a greater voice. MCCJ was at the forefront of the local struggle for racial justice — organizing mixed youth groups and community events in times of segregation.

Since 1935, MCCJ organizes monthly Clergy Dialogues on theological and social issues among faith leaders of all denominations, thus hosting the oldest interfaith dialogue forum in the United States.

In the area of youth development, MCCJ's Heritage Panel is a prejudice reduction program that empowers high school students to explore cultural diversity and develop self-esteem, while fostering values that support the appreciation of differences. The program reduces bullying, taunting, cliques and harassment in the classroom while allowing students to take pride in their heritage and identity. Using a peer education methodology, Heritage Panel presentations conducted by the program graduates create a ripple effect that improves the school climate, thereby enabling more students to reach their full potential.

Annually, at its Humanitarian Awards Gala, MCCJ honors community leaders who have made exceptional contributions to improving human and intergroup relations in Greater Miami.

External links 
 MCCJ google page

References

Interfaith organizations
1935 establishments in Florida